Molfetta Lighthouse is an active lighthouse located on the elbow of the east pier of the harbour of Molfetta, in Apulia on the Adriatic Sea.

Description
The lighthouse is completely automated and is managed by the Marina Militare with the identification code number 3752 E.F.

See also
 List of lighthouses in Italy
 Molfetta

References

External links

 Servizio Fari Marina Militare

Lighthouses in Italy